The Cagayan Provincial Board is the Sangguniang Panlalawigan (provincial legislature) of the Philippine province of Cagayan.

The members are elected via plurality-at-large voting: the province is divided into three districts, the first two sending three members to the provincial board, while the third sends four members; the electorate votes, and the number of winning candidates depends on the number of members their district sends. The vice governor is the ex officio presiding officer, and only votes to break ties. The vice governor is elected via the plurality voting system province-wide.

The districts used in appropriation of members is coextensive with the legislative districts of Cagayan.

District apportionment

List of members
An additional three ex officio members are the presidents of the provincial chapters of the Association of Barangay Captains, the Councilors' League, the Sangguniang Kabataan
provincial president; the municipal and city (if applicable) presidents of the Association of Barangay Captains, Councilor's League and Sangguniang Kabataan, shall elect amongst themselves their provincial presidents which shall be their representatives at the board.

Current members 
These are the members after the 2019 local elections and 2018 barangay and SK elections:

 Vice Governor: Melvin Vargas Jr. (UNA)

Vice Governor

1st District

2nd District

3rd District

References 

Provincial boards in the Philippines
Politics of Cagayan